Then Was Then – Now Is Now! is a 1965 album by Peggy Lee.

Track listing
"Trapped (In the Web of Love)" (Jeanne Burns) - 2:07
"Losers Weepers" from the motion picture Marriage on the Rocks (Bert Kaempfert, Charles Singleton, Eddie Snyder) - 2:29
"Free Spirits" (Norman Mapp) - 1:53
"I Go to Sleep" (Ray Davies) - 1:59
"Leave It To Love" (Lee Burke, Irving Szathmary) - 2:04
"The Shadow Of Your Smile" Love theme from The Sandpiper (Johnny Mandel, Paul Francis Webster) - 2:23
"They Say" (Dick Hyman, David Mann, George David Weiss) - 2:30
"Seventh Son" (Willie Dixon) - 2:23
"Then Was Then (And Now Is Now)" (Cy Coleman, Peggy Lee) - 2:24
"Ev'rybody Has the Right to Be Wrong (At Least Once)" from the Broadway musical Skyscraper (Jimmy Van Heusen, Sammy Cahn) - 1:52
"(I'm Afraid) The Masquerade Is Over" (Allie Wrubel, Herb Magidson) - 4:01

References

1965 albums
Peggy Lee albums
Albums arranged by Sid Feller
Albums produced by Dave Cavanaugh
Capitol Records albums